Heidi Horten (née Jelinek; 13 February 1941 – 12 June 2022) was an Austrian billionaire and art collector. She was the widow of businessman Helmut Horten. In May 2020 Forbes estimated her net worth at US$3.0 billion.

Biography
Horten inherited her wealth upon the death of her husband, the founder of the German department store business Horten AG. Horten had met her husband when she was aged 19; he was 32 years older than her. Horten was part of the board of Helmut Horten Stiftung, a charitable foundation that supports various healthcare related institutions, funds medical research, and helps individuals in need.

Horten divided her time between Vienna, Austria, and Ticino, Switzerland, when in Europe, and Lyford Cay in the Bahamas. Horten owned the Carinthia VII, a 315-foot yacht, and enjoyed hunting and art collecting. Horten sold the 35.56 carat Wittelsbach Diamond, formerly part of the Crown Jewels of Bavaria, for $24 million in 2008.

In August 2019, it emerged that Horten had donated almost one million euros in 2018 and 2019 to the Austrian People's Party (ÖVP).

Art collection
Horten amassed an art collection of over 500 works, which included paintings by Pablo Picasso, Marc Chagall, Jean-Michel Basquiat, Andy Warhol, Gerhard Richter, Georg Baselitz, and Yves Klein. In 2018, 170 works from the Heidi Horten Collection were exhibited at Leopold Museum in Vienna.

In 2019, Horten announced plans to open a private museum, having bought a 155-year-old,  mansion in Vienna to house the collection. Designed by architects Marie-Therese Harnoncourt-Fuchs and Ernst Fuchs, the museum opened to the public in 2022.

References

Further reading
 
 

1941 births
2022 deaths
Austrian art collectors
Austrian billionaires
Austrian businesspeople
Austrian expatriates in Switzerland
Philanthropists from Vienna
Female billionaires
Recipients of the Austrian Cross of Honour for Science and Art